High Street Records was a subsidiary label of Windham Hill Records from about 1990 to 1997. Notable acts who recorded for the label include John Gorka, Pierce Pettis, Patty Larkin, The Subdudes, Downy Mildew, and Dots Will Echo. Several singer-songwriters associated with High Street appeared on the 1989 Windham Hill compilation, Legacy: A Collection of New Folk Music and the 1992 follow-up on High Street, Legacy II: A Collection of Singer-songwriters.

See also
 List of record labels

References

American record labels
Record labels established in 1990
Record labels disestablished in 1997
Folk record labels